Mini-UHF connectors are miniaturized versions of UHF connectors, designed primarily for use in bag-type mobile phones and similar applications where size is an important consideration.  Introduced in the 1970s, Mini-UHF has a 3/8-24 thread size and operates up to 2.5 GHz. It is similar only in basic construction, a threaded outer portion, center pin, and toothed ends intended to prevent twisting and loosening. Its performance is much better than the standard UHF.

See also
 UHF connector

External links
 Description of Miniature UHF connector

References

RF connectors